{{Infobox settlement
| name                            = 
| image_skyline                   = 
| image_caption                   = 
| image_seal                      = Seal_of_President_Quirino,_Sultan_Kudarat.png
| seal_size                       = 100x80px
| image_map                       = 
| map_caption                     = 
| image_map1                      = 
| pushpin_map                     = Philippines
| pushpin_label_position          = left
| pushpin_map_caption             = Location within the 
| coordinates                     = 
| settlement_type                 = 
| subdivision_type                = Country
| subdivision_name                = Philippines
| subdivision_type1               = Region
| subdivision_name1               = 
| subdivision_type2               = Province
| subdivision_name2               = 
| official_name                   = 
| etymology                       = 
| named_for                       = Elpidio Quirino
| native_name                     = 
| other_name                      = 
| nickname                        = {{plainlist|
 Jewel of Southcentral Mindanao 
 Gateway to Lake Buluan & Maguindanao
}}
| anthem                          = 
| subdivision_type3               = District
| subdivision_name3               = 
| established_title               = Founded
| established_date                = November 22, 1973
| parts_type                      = Barangays
| parts_style                     = para
| p1                              =   (see Barangays)
| leader_title                    =  
| leader_name                     = Azel V. Mangudadatu
| leader_title1                   = Vice Mayor
| leader_name1                    = Ma. Katrina Buena F. Sandigan
| leader_title2                   = Representative 
| leader_name2                    = Bai Rihan M. Sakaluran
| leader_title3          = Municipal Council
| leader_name3           = 
| leader_title4                   = Electorate
| leader_name4                    =  voters
| government_type                 = 
| government_footnotes            = 
| elevation_m                     = 
| elevation_max_m                 = 69
| elevation_min_m                 = 13
| elevation_max_rank              =
| elevation_min_rank              =
| elevation_footnotes             = 
| elevation_max_footnotes         = 
| elevation_min_footnotes         = 
| area_rank                       = 
| area_footnotes                  = 
| area_total_km2                  = 
| population_footnotes            = 
| population_total                = 
| population_as_of                = 
| population_density_km2          = auto
| population_blank1_title         = Households
| population_blank1               =  
| population_blank2_title         = 
| population_blank2               = 
| population_demonym              = 
| population_rank                 = 
| population_note                 = 
| timezone                        = PST
| utc_offset                      = +8
| postal_code_type                = ZIP code
| postal_code                     = 
| postal2_code_type               = 
| postal2_code                    = 
| area_code_type                  = 
| area_code                       = 
| website                         = 
| demographics_type1     = Economy
| demographics1_title1   = 
| demographics1_info1    = 
| demographics1_title2   = Poverty incidence
| demographics1_info2    = %
| demographics1_title3   = Revenue
| demographics1_info3    =   
| demographics1_title4   = Revenue rank
| demographics1_info4    = 
| demographics1_title5   = Assets
| demographics1_info5    =   
| demographics1_title6   = Assets rank
| demographics1_info6    = 
| demographics1_title7   = IRA
| demographics1_info7    =  
| demographics1_title8   = IRA rank
| demographics1_info8    = 
| demographics1_title9   = Expenditure
| demographics1_info9    =   
| demographics1_title10  = Liabilities
| demographics1_info10   =  
| demographics_type2     = Service provider
| demographics2_title1   = Electricity
| demographics2_info1    =  
| demographics2_title2   = Water
| demographics2_info2    =  
| demographics2_title3   = Telecommunications
| demographics2_info3    = 
| demographics2_title4   = Cable TV
| demographics2_info4    =
| demographics2_title5   = 
| demographics2_info5    =
| demographics2_title6   = 
| demographics2_info6    =
| demographics2_title7   = 
| demographics2_info7    =
| demographics2_title8   = 
| demographics2_info8    =
| demographics2_title9   = 
| demographics2_info9    =
| demographics2_title10  = 
| demographics2_info10   =
| blank_name_sec1        = 
| blank_info_sec1        = 
| blank1_name_sec1       = Native languages
| blank1_info_sec1       = 
| blank2_name_sec1       = Crime index
| blank2_info_sec1       = 
| blank3_name_sec1       = 
| blank3_info_sec1       = 
| blank4_name_sec1       = 
| blank4_info_sec1       = 
| blank5_name_sec1       = 
| blank5_info_sec1       = 
| blank6_name_sec1       = 
| blank6_info_sec1       = 
| blank7_name_sec1       = 
| blank7_info_sec1       = 
| blank1_name_sec2       = Major religions
| blank1_info_sec2       = 
| blank2_name_sec2       = Feast date
| blank2_info_sec2       = 
| blank3_name_sec2       = Catholic diocese
| blank3_info_sec2       =
| blank4_name_sec2       = Patron saint 
| blank4_info_sec2       = 
| blank5_name_sec2       = 
| blank5_info_sec2       = 
| blank6_name_sec2       = 
| blank6_info_sec2       = 
| blank7_name_sec2       = 
| blank7_info_sec2       =
| short_description      =
| footnotes              =
}}

President Quirino, officially the Municipality of President Quirino (Filipino: Bayan ng President Quirino; Hiligaynon: Banwa sang President Quirino; Maguindanaon: Inged nu President Kirinu, Jawi: ايڠايد نو ڤريسيدنت كيرينو), is a 3rd class municipality in the province of Sultan Kudarat, Philippines. According to the 2020 census, it has a population of 42,244 people.

History

President Quirino was formerly called as Sambulawan and it is actually the portion of the Municipality of Buluan, Maguindanao and Tacurong City. Pres. Quirino was created into a separate municipality on November 22, 1973, at the same time when the Province of Cotabato was divided into the provinces of North Cotabato, Maguindanao, and Sultan Kudarat, by presidential decree 341 of President Ferdinand Marcos.

Geography
President Quirino is located at the center of Central Mindanao. It is situated at the crossroads of the Davao-General Santos-Cotabato highways.

In the northern part is the municipality of General Salipada K. Pendatun, Maguindanao, in the eastern part is municipality of Buluan, Maguindanao, in the western part is the city of Tacurong and the southern part is the municipality of Tantangan, South Cotabato, in south-eastern part is municipality of Lutayan and Mangudadatu.

President Quirino is a vast plain municipality having one barangay (Estrella) extending to the lakeside of the famous Buluan Lake. It has four existing types of soil namely; tinambulan peat, Banga sandy loam, Lutayan clay, and hydrosol.

Barangays
President Quirino is politically subdivided into 19 barangays.

Climate

Demographics

Language
People speak Maguindanao, Tagalog, Cebuano, Ilocano and Hiligaynon. Most of the residents came from Pangasinan, Ilocos Sur and National Capital Region, with significant settlers from Iloilo and Negros. Indigenous people such as Blaan, Manobo and T'boli can be founded in Barangay Bagumbayan, Manobo can be found on Barangay Kalanawe I and Barangay Tinaungan, Blaan from Barangay San Jose and Islam or Muslim on Barangay Bayawa as the barangay is near to the Municipality of Buluan which is from the province of Maguindanao.

Economy
 
President Quirino is the one of the economic and agricultural town in the Philippines, some of this is selling "sukang tuba at tubo" or vinegar of the coconut/sugarcane. And one of this is the finest "muscovado", is a type of partially refined to unrefined brown sugar with a strong molasses content and flavour.

Small-scale industries include electronics and repair shop, car/motor vehicle body builder/repair shop, vulcanizing and machine shop, shoe and appliance repair shops hollow blocks/culvert making basket/mat weaving, dressmaking/tailoring, balut making, bakery. Other major industries is the rattan making, Banana, Coconut, Palay, Corn and African Palm Oils. People doing an corn -drying process, rice milling and other milling process, are found in the poblacion or in central town.

Culture

Sambuyawan Festival
Sambuyawan is celebrated every third week of November on giving way on its foundation in 1973. Cultures, local products, and tradition are shown in the festival such as Street dancing, drum & lyre, singing, dancing and other activities. Festival's name was derived from the former town named Sambulawan''.

Muscovado / Tagapulot Festival
The Muscovado Festival is celebrated every December 12, In which people must be recognized the town's own economic product which is Tagapulot or sweet Sugarcane candy from the sugarcane plantations.

Insfrastructure

Transportation
President Quirino has no any public transport terminal, but there has habal-habal, jeepney, multicab, and bus transportation where you can hop in around the Kidapawan-Junction highway.

Communications
President Quirino has an official lane of Smart Communication tower substation and Globe Telecom substation in Barangay Poblacion. The Philippine Long Distance Telephone Company provides fixed line services. Wireless mobile communications services are provided by Smart Communications and Globe Telecommunications.

References

External links
President Quirino Profile at PhilAtlas.com
President Quirino Profile at the DTI Cities and Municipalities Competitive Index
[ Philippine Standard Geographic Code]
Philippine Census Information
Local Governance Performance Management System

Municipalities of Sultan Kudarat
Establishments by Philippine presidential decree